Pacific Vibrations is a 1970 surfing documentary.

See also
 List of American films of 1970

References

External links

1970 films
1970 documentary films
American sports documentary films
Documentary films about surfing
American surfing films
1970s English-language films
1970s American films